The earliest dictionaries of the Polish language were bilingual aids, usually Polish–Latin, and date to the 15th century. The first dictionary dedicated solely to the Polish language was published in the early 19th century. Many dictionaries of the Polish language are named simply "the Dictionary of the Polish Language" or in similar fashion.

Bilingual 

The first Polish dictionaries took the form of Polish–Latin (or more correctly, Old Polish–Latin) bilingual translation aids and date to the 15th century. The largest of those earliest dictionaries was the Silesian Mamotrekt kaliski (from ), with about 7,000 entries. The 16th century saw a proliferation of printed dictionaries; the first of those were written abroad and reprinted in Poland. The first such dictionary was the trilingual German–Latin–Polish  from 1526.

General 

Many dictionaries in the Polish language and dedicated to the Polish language bear the generic name Słownik języka polskiego (lit. the Dictionary of the Polish Language).  was published by Samuel Linde in the early 19th century (in six volumes from 1807 to 1814) and had 60,000 entries. Numerous other dictionaries of the Polish language have been published since. After World War II, a major dictionary of the Polish language was the Słownik języka polskiego of Witold Doroszewski, published in volumes from 1958 to 1969, which quickly became considered a new classic.

Specialized 
There are also many specialized dictionaries in Polish. Some are focused on the Polish language, such as the etymological Słownik etymologiczny języka polskiego (from 1927, edited by Aleksander Brückner); but many others focus on non-language topics, such as the Polish Biographical Dictionary.

See also 
 History of Polish
 Polish proverbs

References

Further reading

External links 
 Słownik języka polskiego at Wiktionary
 Wielki słownik języka polskiego at IJP PAN
 Słownik polszczyzny XVI wieku (Dictionary of 16th century Polish language) at IJP PAN
 Słownik języka polskiego at Polish Scientific Publishers PWN
 Słownik języka polskiego (edited by prof. Doroszewski, 1958–1969) at Polish Scientific Publishers PWN
 miejski.pl – Polish equivalent of the Urban Dictionary

 
Polish language
15th-century establishments in Poland